Kabatiella is a genus of fungi belonging to the family Saccotheciaceae.

The genus was circumscribed by Czech mycologist František Bubák in 1907.

The genus name of Kabatiella is in honour of Josef Emanuel Kabát (1849 - 1925), who was a Czech botanist (studying Lichenology and Mycology).

Species
Kabatiella apocrypta 
Kabatiella babajaniae 
Kabatiella berberidis 
Kabatiella borealis 
Kabatiella bubakiana 
Kabatiella bupleuri 
Kabatiella caulivora 
Kabatiella emblicae 
Kabatiella gleditschiae 
Kabatiella lini 
Kabatiella microstromoides 
Kabatiella nigricans 
Kabatiella nigricola 
Kabatiella platani 
Kabatiella polyspora 
Kabatiella silenicola 
Kabatiella superficialis 
Kabatiella tilletioides 
Kabatiella tubercularioides 
Kabatiella zeae

References

Dothideales
Dothideomycetes genera
Taxa described in 1907